The F4, officially referred to as the F4 Boğaziçi Üni./Hisarüstü–Aşiyan funicular line is a  long funicular railway in Beşiktaş, Istanbul.

The line begins at Boğaziçi Üniversitesi station and heads east to Aşiyan along the Bosporus. It is connected to the M6 line at Boğaziçi Üniversitesi. The entrance to Boğaziçi Üniversitesi station is constructed next to the main entrance to Boğaziçi University.

Line

References

Istanbul Metro
Passenger rail transport in Turkey
Standard gauge railways in Turkey
Beşiktaş
Railway lines opened in 2022
Funicular railways in Istanbul